Özcan Arkoç (2 October 1939 – 17 February 2021) was a Turkish footballer who played as a goalkeeper, most notably for German club Hamburger SV.

Career
Arkoç was born in Hayrabolu, Turkey in 1939. He began his football career at Vefa. He transferred to Fenerbahçe in 1958 and to Beşiktaş in 1962. With Fenerbahçe, he won two Süper Lig championships. He also played for Austria Wien between 1964 and 1967. The first Turkish professional to feature in the Bundesliga, he played for Hamburger SV for nine seasons and retired in 1975. He played in the European Cup Winners' Cup final in 1968 losing 2–0 to AC Milan.

In 1976, he became the assistant coach next to Kuno Klötzer at Hamburger SV, the duo would lead Hamburger SV to a European Cup Winners' Cup in 1977. He became the head coach of Hamburger SV in 1977 for one season and the first Turkish manager of a Bundesliga club, his side's stars including Kevin Keegan and Manfred Kaltz. Under Özcan, Hamburger SV played in the 1977 UEFA Super Cup, losing 7–1 on aggregate to Liverpool F.C.

Özcan died at the age of 81 in Hamburg on 17 February 2021.

Honours
Hamburger SV
 UEFA Cup Winners' Cup runner-up: 1967–68

References

External links 
 
 
 Arkoç Özcan at austria-archiv.at 

1939 births
2021 deaths
People from Hayrabolu
Turkish footballers
Association football goalkeepers
Turkey international footballers
Vefa S.K. footballers
Fenerbahçe S.K. footballers
Beşiktaş J.K. footballers
FK Austria Wien players
Hamburger SV players
Bundesliga players
Turkish football managers
Bundesliga managers
Hamburger SV managers
Wormatia Worms managers
Holstein Kiel managers
Turkish expatriate football managers
Turkish expatriate footballers
Turkish expatriate sportspeople in West Germany
Expatriate footballers in West Germany
Expatriate football managers in West Germany
Turkish expatriate sportspeople in Austria
Expatriate footballers in Austria